Guilherme Henrique dos Reis Lazaroni (born 18 November 1992), commonly known as Guilherme Lazaroni, is a Brazilian footballer who plays as a left back for Novorizontino.

Career statistics

Club

Notes

References

External links
 

1992 births
Living people
Brazilian footballers
Brazilian expatriate footballers
Association football midfielders
Figueirense FC players
Tombense Futebol Clube players
Fortaleza Esporte Clube players
Portimonense S.C. players
Clube Atlético Linense players
Red Bull Brasil players
Sport Club do Recife players
Campeonato Brasileiro Série A players
Liga Portugal 2 players
Campeonato Brasileiro Série B players
Primeira Liga players
Brazilian expatriate sportspeople in Portugal
Expatriate footballers in Portugal